ARY Film Award for Best Star Debut Male is one of the ARY Film Awards of Merit presented annually by the ARY Digital Network and Entertainment Channel to recognize the male actor who has delivered an outstanding debut performance while working in the film industry. Since its inception, however, the award has commonly been referred to as the AFA for Best Star Debut Male. While actors are nominated for this award by AFA members who are actors and actresses themselves, winners are selected by the AFA membership as a whole.

History

The Best Star Debut Male category originates with the 1st ARY Film Awards ceremony since 2014. The Best Star Debut Male is awarded by viewers voting and known as Best Star Debut Male Viewers Choice but officially it is termed as Best Star Debut Male. Since ARY Film Awards has been just started, this category has not a brief history.

Hamza Ali Abbasi who is the current winner of this category have also won Best Supporting Actor for his performance in Waar.

Winners and nominees 
As of the first ceremony, total of five actors were nominated. This category is among fourteen Viewers Awards in ARY Film Awards. 
Date and the award ceremony shows that the 2010 is the period from 2010 to 2020 (10 years-decade), while the year above winners and nominees shows that the film year in which they were releases, and the figure in bracket shows the ceremony number, for example; an award ceremony is held for the films of its previous year.

2010s

References

External links 

 ARY Film Awards Official website

ARY Film Award winners
ARY Film Awards
Film awards for male debut actors